Stratigraphy and Geological Correlation is a bimonthly peer-reviewed scientific journal covering fundamental and applied aspects of stratigraphy. It was established in 1993 and is published by  Springer Science+Business Media on behalf of MAIK Nauka/Interperiodica.

External links 
 

Springer Science+Business Media academic journals
Nauka academic journals
Bimonthly journals
Publications established in 1993
English-language journals
Geology journals